Bordrin was a  Chinese automobile manufacturer that specialized in developing electric vehicles, that was  headquartered in Nanjing, China.

History 
Bordrin was founded in 2016 by Huang Ximing, and was based in Nanjing. In 2018, Bordrin partnered with Torc Robotics, based in  Blacksburg, Virginia. In 2019, Bordrin created 3 electric SUV platforms: The i-SP, i-MP and i-LP. Bordrin also founded a partnership with Tianjin FAW Xiali Automobile Co., another electric vehicle company based in China, in 2019.

Bordrin's first vehicle was the iV6, introduced in 2019. The interior features a  multimedia touch screen, and a one-touch climate system. The iV6 can be fully charged in one hour.

In 2019, Bordrin introduced the iV7. It is also called the iEV7. It was first shown on April 16, 2019, at the Shanghai Auto Show.

Because of economic crisis caused by the COVID-19 pandemic, Bordrin's sales and vehicle price went down in the year 2020. Bordrin made $10.23 million during the pandemic, when in 2019, they made $33.61 million. Bordrin filed for bankruptcy in early 2021 and underwent liquidation.

Vehicles

Past concept models 
Bordrin had 2 concept vehicles.

See also 
 Leapmotor
 Min'an Electric
 Sinogold

References 

Electric vehicle manufacturers of China
Car brands
Car manufacturers of China
Chinese brands
Cars of China
Defunct motor vehicle manufacturers of China